The 2012 BBL Champions Cup was the seventh edition of the super cup game in German basketball, and was played on September 30, 2012. The game was played in the Brose Arena in Bamberg. Defending BBL champions Brose Baskets took on ratiopharm Ulm, that qualified as the runner-up in the BBL-Pokal last season.

Match

References

BBL Champions Cup
Champions Cup